The Purcell Society, founded in 1876 (principally by William Hayman Cummings) is an organization dedicated to making the complete musical works of Henry Purcell available. Between 1876 and 1965, scores of all the known works of Purcell were published, in 32 volumes. Advances in musical scholarship and editorial techniques in the decades after the first volumes were issued meant that by the second half of the 20th century they were no longer meeting the needs of users. Beginning in the 1960s, the Purcell Society began to issue revised versions of the scores. The website gives details of the scores in the revised series that are currently available.

Holding libraries
All volumes of the complete work of Henry Purcell published by the Purcell Society are available in the Zentral- und Landesbibliothek Berlin and the British Library in London.

The FAL library at the University of New Mexico has in its possession most of the volumes, with some added revised editions. The FAL is missing vols. 1, 6, 8, 10, 16, 18, 21, 23.

See also
List of compositions by Henry Purcell
Godfrey Edward Pellew Arkwright

External links
 Official site of the Purcell Society

International music organizations
Organizations established in 1876
Music publishing companies of the United Kingdom
Music organisations based in the United Kingdom
Arts organizations established in the 1870s
1876 establishments in the United Kingdom